Oliva chrysoplecta is a species of sea snail, a marine gastropod mollusk in the family Olividae, the olives.

Description
The length of the shell varies between 15 mm and 27 mm.

Distribution
This marine species occurs off Okinawa, the Philippines and Fiji.

References

External links
 

chrysoplecta
Molluscs described in 1989